James Bankhead (1783–1856) was a U. S. Army officer who rose to the rank of brevet brigadier general and served in the War of 1812, Second Seminole War, and Mexican–American War.

Biography 
James Bankhead was born on May 24, 1783, in Port Royal, in Caroline County, Virginia.

Bankhead joined the U. S. Army in 1808, as a captain in the 5th Infantry Regiment.  Bankhead and Winfield Scott entered the army on the same day and they remained lifelong friends.  Before the War of 1812, Bankhead served in various commands and staff assignments.  During the war he was promoted to major.  Later he was on the staff of General Wade Hampton, and received a brevet promotion to lieutenant colonel.

His duties as an Army officer took him to Charleston, South Carolina where he met and married the fourth daughter of John Pyne, Ann Smith Pyne, in her mother's home on Church Street on 25 June 1817.

He attained the rank of lieutenant colonel of the 3rd Artillery Regiment, on April 26, 1832.

He saw active service during the Second Seminole War and received a brevet promotion to colonel in 1838 to recognize his bravery.

Col. Bankhead was in command of the garrison of the Buffalo Barracks from October 1838 to August 1841.

Bankhead served in the Mexican–American War, at Vera Cruz commanding the 2nd Artillery Regiment and was promoted to brevet Brigadier General for distinguished service in the reduction of Vera Cruz where Bankhead, the senior field officer, acted as chief of artillery, in command of the batteries.  From January 1848 he commanded the Department of Orizaba, Mexico.

Bankhead was appointed commander of the Department of the East in 1854, and made his headquarters at Fort McHenry, where he served until his death.  He died and was buried, in Green Mount Cemetery, Baltimore, Maryland on November 11, 1856.

Notes

External links
Print of James Bankhead, Colonel 2d Artillery

United States Army colonels
1783 births
1856 deaths
United States Army personnel of the War of 1812
American people of the Seminole Wars
American military personnel of the Mexican–American War
People from Port Royal, Virginia